Mines Nancy (École Nationale Supérieure des Mines de Nancy in French or Nancy School of Mines in English; also referred to as ENSMN, École des Mines de Nancy or Mines Nancy) is one of the leading French engineering Grandes Écoles.

It is located in the campus Artem, in the city of Nancy, Eastern France (only 1h30 from Paris by TGV), and is part of the University of Lorraine. Around 400 students are taught general science and management and 300 follow specialised Master programs. These students are taught by 60 permanent professors. There are also 400 researchers including a hundred PhD students.
Despite its small size, it is well represented in the French industry. Most of its alumni hold executive positions in the industry and large corporations or scientific research positions in France or abroad.

It was created in 1919 on the request of the University of Nancy in order to contribute to the reconstruction of the mining and steel industry in the east of France after World War I. At the end of the 1950s, under the impulse of its then-director Bertrand Schwartz (younger brother of Laurent Schwartz), the school reorganized its curriculum to include a balanced blend of engineering, management and social sciences. At the time, it was an innovative educational model for engineers, that was later extended to other Grandes Ecoles.

The Ingénieur civil des Mines degree

Description

The school was initially aimed at training mining engineers. In 1957, its director Bertrand Schwartz began its transformation into a modern "generalist" school. The school focuses on training innovative managers for the industry and researchers, with a broad generalist and high scientific knowledge, able to communicate in different languages.
The Ingénieurs civils des Mines degree (Master of Science and Executive Engineering) is ranked among the best French Grande Ecole degrees. 20% of the students are international students, mainly from Morocco, Tunisia and China. In addition to the general science (advanced mathematics and physics) and management classes, the students have to specialise (one third of their classes) from their second year to the third (and last) year:
 "Département Matériaux" (materials and mechanics) 
 "Département Énergie" (energetics and environment)
 "Département Génie Industriel" (applied mathematics and industrial engineering)
 "Département Information et Systèmes" (computer science)
 "Département Géoingénierie" (geosciences and civil engineering).
The students must learn English and at least another language.

Internships
The students have to do at least three internships in order to get the degree.
Operator internship (6 weeks), whose aim is to discover the reality of work, become aware of the repetitive nature or physical difficulties of the tasks and understand human relations within a company.
Assistant-engineer internship (at least 10 weeks).
Engineer internship (at least 20 weeks, usually around 6 months), the end-of-course thesis has to be research oriented.
The engineer internship is usually an opportunity for the companies to hire the students.

Admission
For students having studied in the Classe Préparatoire aux Grandes Ecoles (a two-year highly selective undergraduate program in Mathematics, Physics), admission to the Ingénieur Civil des Mines degree is decided through a nationwide competitive examination ( Concours Commun Mines-Ponts) and their origin can vary: MP, PC, PSI..., with a number of places for each which was, in 2015:

 MP: 54
 PC: 32
 PSI: 40
 PT: 4
 TSI: 3
 CCP (concours commun polytechniques): 5
 AST: 5

It is also possible for student to be accepted for specialised master's or an exchange programs, in particular through partnerships with other schools or universities around the world.

The Ingénieur degree in Industrial Engineering and Materials

Description

The Industrial Engineering and Materials Grande Ecole program [Ingénieur spécialité Génie Industriel et Matériaux] was established in 1991 under the joint initiative of Ecole des Mines de Nancy and its three partner companies: Renault, Saint-Gobain PAM and ArcelorMittal. This three-year graduate program is designed to provide students with general science and high skills in two complementary fields:

 Materials Science and Engineering

 Industrial Engineering

At the end of this graduate program, students are granted the Ingénieur degree in Industrial Engineering and Materials (Master of Science in Engineering), a French Grande Ecole degree (Diplôme d'Ingénieur) validated by Commission des Titres d’Ingénieur (CTI).
In 2018, 80% of graduates found a job before graduation and 100% were hired within 4 months after graduation. 19% of graduates work in the automotive, aviation, naval, and rail industries, 12% in consulting firms and some graduates continue their materials science research in research institutes.

Internships
Technician internship in the first year (at least 19 weeks).

Assistant engineer internship in the second year (5 months).

Engineer internship in the final year (6 months).

Admission

This Grande Ecole graduate program admits the students from Classe Préparatoire aux Grandes Ecoles (PT, TSI, ATS, CPP) and the best students from French universities (bachelor's degree or 2-year technical degree). The first round of selection is primarily based on students' undergraduate transcripts. Students who pass the first round must take the IELTS test and pass an interview at Ecole des Mines de Nancy. The admission is competitive, with only about 25 students admitted each year. In addition, there are also about 3 students from international partner universities of Ecole des Mines de Nancy admitted to this program.

The Ingénieur degree in Mechanical design

After ingénieur civil des Mines and ingénieur industrial engineering and matérials, this engineering Grande Ecole program was established in 2000. Students who accomplish this three-year engineering curriculum receive the Ingénieur degree in Mechanical design [Ingénieur Génie Mécanique parcours ingénierie de la conception], a French Grande Ecole degree (Diplôme d'Ingénieur) validated by Commission des Titres d’Ingénieur (CTI).

Research

LSG2M: science and engineering of materials and metallurgy
LSGS: science and engineering of surfaces
LPM: physics of materials
GeoRessources: Geological resources and hazards
CRPG: petrography and geochemistry
LORIA: computer science and its applications
ERPI: innovative Processes

Forum Est-Horizon

The students of the ENSMN organize their own meeting with professionals, who present their companies and their activities.
The FORUM EST-HORIZON is currently the biggest meeting between the professional world and the students in the East of France. With 50 exhibitors covering a large variety of economic and industrial fields, the forum gathered last year over 1000 students, looking for advice, information and internships.

Famous alumni
 Jean-Claude Trichet, president of the European Central Bank from 2003 to 2011
 Jacques Bouriez, chief executive officer of Louis Delhaize Group
 Patrick Cousot, professor at New York University
 Louis Doucet, chief executive officer of GE Money Bank
 Bertrand Méheut, chief executive officer of Canal+ group
 Amina Benkhadra, former Moroccan minister of energy, mines, water and environment since 2007.
 Kofi Yamgnane, mayor of Saint-Coulitz (Brittany), mayor of Saint-Briac (Brittany), French junior minister of social integration in 1991-1993 and deputy of Finistère in the French Parlement in 1997-2002. He ran for the 2010 Togolese presidential election.
 Philippe Guillemot, chief executive officer of AREVA T&D

The board of directors
among its members:

Anne Lauvergeon, chief executive officer of AREVA
Claude Imauven, chief executive officer of Saint-Gobain PAM, chief executive officer of Saint-Gobain 
Jean-Yves Koch, managing director of Capgemini

Other schools of Mines in France
 École nationale supérieure des Mines d'Albi Carmaux (Mines Albi-Carmaux)
 École nationale supérieure des Mines d'Alès (Mines Alès)
 École nationale supérieure des Mines de Douai (Mines Douai)
 École nationale supérieure des Mines de Nantes (Mines Nantes)
 École nationale supérieure des Mines de Paris (Mines ParisTech)
 École nationale supérieure des mines de Saint-Étienne (Mines Saint-Étienne)

Other schools of Mines in Africa
 École nationale supérieure des Mines de Rabat (Mines Rabat)

Other schools of Mines in the USA
 Colorado School of Mines

See also
 École nationale supérieure des Mines d'Albi Carmaux (Mines Albi-Carmaux)
 École nationale supérieure des Mines d'Alès (Mines Alès)
 École nationale supérieure des Mines de Douai (Mines Douai)
 École nationale supérieure des Mines de Nantes (Mines Nantes)
 École nationale supérieure des Mines de Paris (MINES ParisTech)
 École nationale supérieure des Mines de Saint-Étienne (Mines Saint-Étienne)
 École Nationale Supérieure des Mines de Rabat (Mines Rabat)

References

External links
 Site of the école nationale supérieure des mines de Nancy
 Promotional site of the Ecole des Mines de Nancy
 Site of the Group des écoles des mines
 Site of students' association of Mines Nancy
 Website of the Journal Télévisé des Mines (audiovisual students' association)
 Site of Forum Est-Horizon
 Site of Arts Students' Association

École nationale supérieure des mines de Nancy

Mining organizations
University of Lorraine
Universities and colleges in Nancy, France
Nancy
Educational institutions established in 1919
1919 establishments in France